Kavaneh-ye Sharif (also Romanized as Kāvāneh-ye Sharīf; also known as Gāvāneh and Kāvdāneh) is a village in Zhavehrud Rural District, in the Central District of Kamyaran County, Kurdistan Province, Iran. At the 2006 census, its population was 16, in 5 families. The village is populated by Kurds.

References 

Towns and villages in Kamyaran County
Kurdish settlements in Kurdistan Province